Kamila Stormowska (born 12 April 2000) is a Polish short track speed skater. She competed at the 2022 Winter Olympics, in Women's 3000 metre relay.

References

External links 

 Kamila Stormowska of Team Poland skates during the Women's 1500m Quarterfinals

2000 births
Living people
Polish female short track speed skaters
Olympic short track speed skaters of Poland
Short track speed skaters at the 2022 Winter Olympics